Thyrotropin-releasing hormone (TRH) is a hypophysiotropic hormone produced by neurons in the hypothalamus that stimulates the release of thyroid-stimulating hormone (TSH) and prolactin from the anterior pituitary.

TRH has been used clinically for the treatment of spinocerebellar degeneration and disturbance of consciousness in humans. Its pharmaceutical form is called protirelin (INN).

Synthesis and release 

TRH is synthesized within parvocellular neurons of the paraventricular nucleus of the hypothalamus. It is translated as a 242-amino acid precursor polypeptide that contains 6 copies of the sequence -Gln-His-Pro-Gly-, flanked by Lys-Arg or Arg-Arg sequences.

To produce the mature form, a series of enzymes are required. First, a protease cleaves to the C-terminal side of the flanking Lys-Arg or Arg-Arg. Second, a carboxypeptidase removes the Lys/Arg residues leaving Gly as the C-terminal residue. Then, this Gly is converted into an amide residue by a series of enzymes collectively known as peptidylglycine-alpha-amidating monooxygenase. Concurrently with these processing steps, the N-terminal Gln (glutamine) is converted into pyroglutamate (a cyclic residue). These multiple steps produce 6 copies of the mature TRH molecule per precursor molecule for human TRH (5 for mouse TRH).

TRH synthesizing neurons of the paraventricular nucleus project to the medial portion of the external layer of the median eminence. Following secretion at the median eminence, TRH travels to the anterior pituitary via the hypophyseal portal system where it binds to the TRH receptor stimulating the release of thyroid-stimulating hormone from thyrotropes and prolactin from lactotropes. The half-life of TRH in the blood is approximately 6 minutes.

Structure 

TRH is a tripeptide, with an amino acid sequence of pyroglutamyl-histidyl-proline amide.

History 

The structure of TRH was first determined, and the hormone synthesized, by Roger Guillemin and Andrew V. Schally in 1969. Both parties insisted their labs determined the sequence first: Schally first suggested the possibility in 1966, but abandoned it after Guillemin proposed TRH was not actually a peptide. Guillemin's chemist began concurring with these results in 1969, as NIH threatened to cut off funding for the project, leading both parties to return to work on synthesis.

Schally and Guillemin shared the 1977 Nobel Prize in Medicine  "for their discoveries concerning the peptide hormone production of the brain." News accounts of their work often focused on their "fierce competition" and use of a very large amount of sheep and pig brains to locate the hormone.

Clinical significance 
TRH is used clinically by intravenous injection (brand name Relefact TRH) to test the response of the anterior pituitary gland; this procedure is known as a TRH test. This is done as diagnostic test of thyroid disorders such as secondary hypothyroidism and in acromegaly.

TRH has anti-depressant and anti-suicidal properties, and in 2012 the U.S. Army awarded a research grant to develop a TRH nasal spray in order to prevent suicide amongst its ranks. The antidepressant properties of TRH are present when TRH is administered intrathecally, or administration into the spine, and the effects are short-lived. Some researchers are testing a prodrug approach to administer TRH orally and have TRH reach the brain without being degraded in the stomach or blood.

TRH has been shown in mice to be an anti-aging agent with a broad spectrum of activities that, because of their actions, suggest that TRH has a fundamental role in the regulation of metabolic and hormonal functions.

Side effects 

Side effects after intravenous TRH administration are minimal. Nausea, flushing, urinary urgency, and mild rise in blood pressure have been reported. After intrathecal administration, shaking, sweating, shivering, restlessness, and mild rise in blood pressure were observed.

See also 
 thyrotropin-releasing hormone receptor
thyroid-stimulating hormone
hypothalamic-pituitary thyroid axis
hypothalamic–pituitary–prolactin axis

References

External links 
 

Galactagogues
Hormones of the hypothalamus
Hormones of the hypothalamus-pituitary-adrenal axis
Hormones of the hypothalamic-pituitary-prolactin axis
Peptide hormones
Thyroid
Tripeptides